Erythrochrus bicolor is a moth in the family Hyblaeidae described by Gottlieb August Wilhelm Herrich-Schäffer in 1858.

References

Hyblaeidae